Dennis Vincent McGinn (born August 26, 1945) is a former American government official and retired United States Navy admiral. He served as Assistant Secretary of the Navy for Energy, Installations and Environment in the Obama administration from 2013 to 2017. A career naval aviator, McGinn was an officer in the United States Navy for 35 years, retiring as a vice admiral.

Outside of government, McGinn held memberships and advisory posts in various government-affiliated, corporate and non-profit organizations. Since 2018, McGinn has served on the board of directors of the Electric Power Research Institute (EPRI).

Early life and education
Born on August 26, 1945, McGinn is a native of Attleboro, Massachusetts. He graduated from the United States Naval Academy in 1967 with a B.S. degree in naval engineering. McGinn attended the U.S. Naval Test Pilot School in 1973 and the Naval War College in 1990 as a CNO Strategic Studies Fellow. He also participated in the National Security Program under the Harvard Kennedy School.

Military career

McGinn received his commission on June 7, 1967 and was designated as a naval aviator in January 1969. He served two operational deployments at sea aboard the aircraft carrier  as a landing signal officer and weapons officer respectively.

As a lieutenant commander and then commander, he commanded the Light Attack Weapons School and fleet replenishment oiler , as well as the strike fighter squadrons VF-125 and VA-27.

As a captain, McGinn served as the final commanding officer of the Forrestal-class aircraft carrier USS Ranger (CV-61) from August 21, 1991 to July 10, 1993, making an extended western Pacific and Indian Ocean deployment.

Upon promotion to rear admiral (lower half), McGinn was assigned as chief of information systems and chief negotiator, Allied Command Europe Restructuring at Supreme Headquarters Allied Powers Europe, and commanded Carrier Group 1 from 1995 to 1996. He became Director, Air Warfare Division of the Office of the Chief of Naval Operations in January 1996, and was promoted to rear admiral in September.

McGinn's nomination as a vice admiral was confirmed on June 25, 1998, and he subsequently commanded the United States Third Fleet from November 1998 to October 2000. His capstone assignment was as the first Deputy Chief of Naval Operations for Warfare Requirements and Programs, and he retired in September 2002.

Private civilian career
McGinn's experiences during the 1973 oil crisis instilled in him a longtime goal to reduce America's overreliance on fossil fuels, believing that it compromised the economy and national security. Consequently, he has joined various organizations that promote clean and renewable energy sources. McGinn said that "there is no one perfect new energy solution—we need a silver buckshot approach because there’s not a silver bullet".

McGinn served as board chairman of the United States Naval Institute from 2001 to 2002, a member (later vice chairman) of the CNA Military Advisory Board from 2007 to 2013, and president and CEO of the American Council on Renewable Energy from 2011 to 2013. Under CNA, he worked closely with former Republican senator John Warner. Additionally, McGinn has been an International Security Senior Fellow of the Rocky Mountain Institute since 2002.

Government career
In 2004, McGinn was appointed to the National Commission on Disabled Veterans Benefits, a government commission mandated by the 2004 NDAA to study the impact of Operation Enduring Freedom and Operation Iraqi Freedom on Department of Defense and Department of Veterans Affairs resources. The commission released its findings in October 2007. McGinn was appointed to the Department of Energy Electricity Advisory Board in 2012.

Assistant Secretary of the Navy for Energy, Installations and Environment

On July 8, 2013, it was announced that McGinn would be nominated by President Barack Obama to be Assistant Secretary of the Navy for Energy, Installations and Environment, replacing Jackalyne Pfannenstiel. At his confirmation hearing, he pledged to consult Congress on any new energy programs initiated by the Navy and to carefully consider "opportunity costs" when reviewing such programs. He was confirmed by the Senate on August 1, 2013, and assumed office on September 3, 2013.

As ASN(EI&E), McGinn was responsible for overseeing Navy functions and programs related to energy, installations, safety and the environment, including the occupational safety of military and civilian personnel. He gave a positive appraisal of the energy initiatives of Marine Corps Logistics Base Albany, commenting that the base has "a good technologically-savvy workforce, a culture that is looking for ways to really value and save energy with energy efficiency". He resigned on January 20, 2017, to make way for the incoming Trump administration.

Post-government career

Since leaving the government, McGinn has continued to occupy advisory roles in various energy-related organizations. On April 12, 2018, it was announced that McGinn had been elected to a four-year term on the board of directors of the Electric Power Research Institute.

In July 2018, McGinn wrote an op-ed through CNN that was critical of the Trump administration's climate change policy and Trump's focus on NATO defense spending.

Personal life
McGinn is married to Susan Kelly Harris. They have 4 children.

Awards and decorations

Bibliography

References

Notes

External links

Living people
1945 births
People from Attleboro, Massachusetts
Military personnel from Massachusetts
United States Navy vice admirals
United States Naval Aviators
United States Naval Academy alumni
United States Naval Test Pilot School alumni
Naval War College alumni
Harvard Kennedy School alumni
Obama administration personnel
United States Assistant Secretaries of the Navy
Recipients of the Navy Distinguished Service Medal
Recipients of the Defense Superior Service Medal
Recipients of the Legion of Merit
Legionnaires of the Legion of Merit
Recipients of the Distinguished Flying Cross (United States)
United States Navy personnel of the Vietnam War
United States Navy personnel of the Gulf War